Bobbie Stoffregen (July 28, 1909 – March 19, 2000), known professionally as Jayne Regan, was an American film actress. Her original name was sometimes seen as Bobby Stoffregen. 

Regan was the daughter of Herman C. and Anna Stoffregen. From age 2 to 15, she studied dance, drama, and singing in addition to attending Mary Institute. In 1932, she graduated with an A. B. degree from Washington University in St. Louis, after which she acted in Western films for Reliable Pictures while attending drama school for two years. She was under contract to Twentieth Century Fox during the 1930s.

On December 21, 1937, Regan married Jerry Gose, a production manager at Twentieth Century Fox. On June 21, 1951, the couple divorced in Hollywood.

Partial filmography

 Ridin' Thru (1934) - Ranch Guest (uncredited)
 Cleopatra (1934) - Lady Vesta
 Terror of the Plains (1934) - Camp Girl (uncredited)
 The Cactus Kid (1935) - Beth
 One More Spring (1935) - Nurse (uncredited)
 The Silver Bullet (1935) - Nora Kane / Mary Kane
 Dante's Inferno (1935) - College Girl (uncredited)
 Texas Jack (1935) - Ann Hall
 Ladies in Love (1936) - Mrs. Drekon (uncredited)
 Stowaway (1936) - Dora Day
 Thin Ice (1937) - (uncredited)
 This Is My Affair (1937) - Girl with Roosevelt
 You Can't Have Everything (1937) - Stewardess (uncredited)
 Wife, Doctor and Nurse (1937) - Hostess (uncredited)
 Second Honeymoon (1937) - Paula
 Thank You, Mr. Moto (1937) - Eleanor Joyce
 Walking Down Broadway (1938) - Jerry Lane
 Mr. Moto's Gamble (1938) - Linda Benton
 Josette (1938) - Cafe Girl (uncredited)
 Always Goodbye (1938) - Fashion Salon Customer (uncredited)
 Booloo (1938) - Kate Jaye
 Keep Smiling (1938) - Leading Woman (uncredited) (final film role)

References

Bibliography
 Pitts, Michael R. Poverty Row Studios, 1929–1940: An Illustrated History of 55 Independent Film Companies, with a Filmography for Each. McFarland & Company, 2005.

External links

1909 births
2000 deaths
American film actresses
People from New York City
20th-century American actresses
Actresses from St. Louis
Western (genre) film actresses
Washington University in St. Louis alumni